Victoria Clark (born October 10, 1959) is an American actress, musical theatre singer and director. Clark has performed in numerous Broadway musicals and in other theatre, film and television works. Her soprano voice can also be heard on innumerable cast albums and several animated films. In 2008, she released her first solo album titled Fifteen Seconds of Grace. In 2005, she won a Tony Award for Best Leading Actress in a Musical for her role in The Light in the Piazza. She also won the Drama Desk Award, Outer Critics Circle Award, and the Joseph Jefferson Award for her performances in the same show.

Life and career
Clark was born and raised in Dallas, Texas, the daughter of Lorraine and Banks Clark. She studied the piano and attended the Hockaday School, an all-girls school in Dallas. She attended the Interlochen Arts Academy before going to Yale University, graduating in 1982.  At Yale, at the age of eighteen, she sang the role of Mabel in Gilbert and Sullivan's comic opera The Pirates of Penzance.  She also sang the title role in Gilbert and Sullivan's Patience, and directed a production of Ruddigore for the Yale Gilbert & Sullivan Society. After college, Clark studied at New York University's Musical Theatre Master's Program as a stage director and began to direct operas and musicals professionally. Although she continues to direct, she has primarily focused on singing and acting.

Clark's stage work includes roles in the Broadway musicals Guys and Dolls (1992–93), A Grand Night for Singing (1993–94), How to Succeed in Business Without Really Trying (1995–96, as Smitty), Titanic (1997–99, creating the role of Alice Beane), Cabaret (1999–2000, as Fraulein Kost) and Urinetown (2003, as Penelope Pennywise), as well as numerous roles Off-Broadway, in national tours and in regional theatre. She played Doris MacAfee in the City Center Encores! production of Bye Bye Birdie in 2004.

In 2005, Clark won the Tony Award for Best Leading Actress in a Musical, a Drama Desk Award, an Outer Critics Circle Award, and the Joseph Jefferson Award for her performance in the musical The Light in the Piazza (2005–06). Broadway.com commented on Clark's performance, "What is indisputable is that Victoria Clark has created a character for the ages. Lucas has done a superb job in fleshing out Margaret within the confines of a musical-theater libretto, and Clark responds with consummate precision and grace. Calling hers the musical performance of the year would be accurate. It would also be a drastic understatement." She appeared as former showgirl Sally Durant Plummer in the Encores! staged concert presentation of Follies in February 2007 at City Center. She next created the role of Margaret Brennan in The Marriage of Bette and Boo Off-Broadway in 2008 for the Roundabout Theatre Company.

Clark appeared in Prayer for My Enemy, a new play by Craig Lucas Off-Broadway at Playwrights Horizons from November 14 through December 21, 2008. The play concerned the consequences that the Iraq war has had on an American family, co-starred Michele Pawk and Jonathan Groff, and was directed by Bartlett Sher.

Clark has also appeared in movies, sung in several animated feature films, and appeared in roles in television episodes. She can be heard on a number of Broadway cast albums and other recordings. In 2008 she released her first solo album, Fifteen Seconds of Grace, produced by PS Classics. Clark teaches voice and studies acting at the Michael Howard Studios and voice with Edward Sayegh. Clark received the 2006 Distinguished Artist Award from the New York Singing Teachers' Association.

Clark played the Mother Superior in the Broadway production of Sister Act, which opened on April 20, 2011. For this role she was nominated for the Tony Award for Best Featured Actress in a Musical. Clark portrayed Sally in the Kennedy Center/Broadway production of Follies, running at the Center Theatre Group/Ahmanson Theatre, Los Angeles, from May 3 through June 9, 2012.

In 2013, Clark starred in the Manhattan Theatre Club's production of The Snow Geese by Sharr White alongside Mary-Louise Parker and Danny Burstein. Previously, she starred as the Fairy Godmother in the Broadway production of Cinderella. For this role, she received her second Tony Award nomination for Best Featured Actress in a Musical. She returned to the Broadway production of Cinderella for a run lasting from January to September 2014. In December 2014 Clark appeared as Carrie Mathison's mother on the Season 4 finale of Showtime's series Homeland. Clark played Mamita in the Broadway revival of Gigi, which opened in April 2015. For this performance, Clark received another nomination for the Tony Award for Best Featured Actress in a Musical.

In 2017, Clark appeared in Sousatzka in Toronto. It was intended to be a pre-Broadway tryout for controversial producer Garth Drabinsky. Clark portrayed the title role. In 2022, she recorded Maury Yeston's December Songs, featuring orchestration by Larry Hochman.

Personal life
Clark married Thomas Reidy on August 1, 2015, in North Carolina.  Her son, T.L., is from her previous marriage.

Filmography

References

External links
 
 
 
Broadway World's profile of Clark
Excerpts from reviews by the major NYC newspapers
Curtainup review of Clark's performance
Victoria Clark – Downstage Center interview at American Theatre Wing.org
TonyAwards.com Interview with Victoria Clark
Time Out New York Interview with Victoria Clark

1959 births
American women singers
American musical theatre actresses
Drama Desk Award winners
Living people
Tony Award winners
Traditional pop music singers
20th-century American actresses
21st-century American actresses
Actresses from Dallas
Yale University alumni
Steinhardt School of Culture, Education, and Human Development alumni
American film actresses
American television actresses
Hockaday School alumni